A Lawman Is Born is a 1937 American Western film directed by Sam Newfield.

Plot summary 
Tom Mitchell is a wanted man that becomes the Sheriff after the previous Sheriff is killed, however Brownlee arrives and reveals Tom's identity.

Cast 
 Johnny Mack Brown as Tom Mitchell
 Iris Meredith as Beth Graham
 Warner Richmond as Kane Briscoe
 Mary MacLaren as Martha Lance
 Dick Curtis as Lefty Drogan
 Earle Hodgins as Sheriff Rock Lance
 Charles King as Bert Moscript
 Frank LaRue as Graham
 Al St. John as Eli Root
 Steve Clark as Sam Brownlee
 Jack C. Smith as Ike Manton

External links 
 
 

1937 films
1937 Western (genre) films
American black-and-white films
Republic Pictures films
American Western (genre) films
Films with screenplays by George H. Plympton
Films directed by Sam Newfield
1930s English-language films
1930s American films